Arnoldus Vanderhorst (March 21, 1748 – January 29, 1815) was an American military officer and planter. He was a general of the South Carolina militia during the American Revolutionary War and served as the governor of South Carolina from 1794 to 1796.

Early life and career

Born in Christ Church Parish, Vanderhorst took up planting at his plantation on the eastern half of Kiawah Island in the Lowcountry. He participated in the Revolutionary War as an officer under the command of Francis Marion. During the war, he also served in the South Carolina House of Representatives from 1776 to 1780 and in the South Carolina Senate from 1780 to 1786. After his service in the state Senate, Vanderhorst was elected mayor of Charleston for two terms. He was elected mayor of Charleston, South Carolina, on September 12, 1785.

Governorship

In 1794, he was elected by the General Assembly as a Federalist to be Governor of South Carolina. During his administration, Vanderhorst pressed the legislature for the revision of the criminal code because the sentences were so harsh that jurors would grant acquittal. In addition, he advocated for a prison system similar to that of the state of Pennsylvania instead of the state jails that "were of medieval barbarity."

Later life

After leaving the governorship in 1796, he returned to his plantation on Kiawah Island where slaves he owned cultivated sea island cotton. Vanderhorst died on January 29, 1815, and he was buried at the St. Michael's churchyard in Charleston. He also proposed the need for a state penitentiary. Later the state penitentiary named Central Correction Institution that was open until 1994.

Archives

Papers of the Vanderhorst family are held at the South Carolina Historical Society and Bristol Archives.

See also

Arnoldus Vander Horst House
Vanderhorst Row

References

External links
SCIway Biography of Arnoldus Vanderhorst
NGA Biography of Arnoldus Vanderhorst
 

1748 births
1815 deaths
People from Charleston County, South Carolina
American people of Dutch descent
American slave owners
South Carolina Federalists
South Carolina militiamen in the American Revolution
Members of the South Carolina House of Representatives
South Carolina state senators
Governors of South Carolina
Militia generals in the American Revolution
Mayors of Charleston, South Carolina
Federalist Party state governors of the United States
19th-century American Episcopalians